Al Daayen is a village in the municipality of Al Daayen in Qatar. Prior to the discovery of oil and natural gas, it was one of the larger fishing and pearling villages on Qatar's east coast.

Etymology
Al Daayen derives its name from the Arabic word "dhaayen", which roughly translates to "travel". It was given this name in reference to the Qatari tribes who abandoned the village and traveled elsewhere in search of water and suitable pasture.

History
J.G. Lorimer's Gazetteer of the Persian Gulf gives an account of the village of Al Daayen in 1908:

Lorimer also notes that a man named Ahmed bin Salman committed piracy off the coast of Al Daayen in 1902.

References

Populated places in Al Daayen